Parcoal is an unincorporated community in Webster County, West Virginia, United States. Parcoal had a post office, which closed on November 26, 1988.

The community derives its name from the Pardee Curtin Lumber Company, the owner of local coal mines.

References

Unincorporated communities in Webster County, West Virginia
Unincorporated communities in West Virginia